Veda Ann Borg (January 11, 1915 – August 16, 1973) was an American film and television actress.

Early years
Borg was born in Boston, Massachusetts, to Gottfried Borg, a Swedish immigrant, and Minna Noble. She became a model in 1936 before winning a contract at Paramount Pictures. An item in a 1936 newspaper described her as a "former New York and Boston manakin" when her signing with Paramount was announced.

Film 

Soon after Borg signed her contract with Paramount, studio officials decided to change her name to Ann Noble for her work in films. However, a newspaper article reported, "Miss Borg contended that her own name is more descriptive of her personality than Ann Noble." Her argument was successful, and she retained her name.

She appeared in more than 100 films, including Mildred Pierce, Chicken Every Sunday, Love Me or Leave Me, Guys and Dolls, Thunder in the Sun, You're Never Too Young, and The Alamo (1960), in which she portrayed the blind Nell Robertson.

Television 
Borg began accepting parts in television when the new medium opened up. From 1952 through 1961, she appeared on shows such as Alfred Hitchcock Presents, General Electric Theater, The 20th Century-Fox Hour, The Abbott and Costello Show, The Restless Gun, Bonanza, The Red Skelton Show, Adventures of Superman, Wild Bill Hickok, and Mr. & Mrs. North, among many others. In early 1953, she was the first actress cast as "Honeybee Gillis" in The Life of Riley TV series, replaced a short time later by first Marie Brown, then Gloria Blondell.

Personal life
A car crash in 1939 required surgical reconstruction of Borg's face.

Borg was married briefly to Paul Herrick (1942) and to film director Andrew McLaglen (1946–1958), with whom she had a son: Andrew Victor McLaglen II. Both marriages ended in divorce. 

Borg was a Democrat who supported Adlai Stevenson's campaign during the 1952 presidential election.

Borg died of cancer in Hollywood in 1973, aged 58. She was cremated and her ashes scattered at sea.

Partial filmography

 Three Cheers for Love (1936) - Consuelo Dormant
 Men in Exile (1937) - Rita Crane
 San Quentin (1937) - Helen
 Kid Galahad (1937) - The Redhead
 The Case of the Stuttering Bishop (1937) - Gladys
 The Singing Marine (1937) - Diane
 Public Wedding (1937) - Bernice
 Marry the Girl (1937) - Nurse with Cartoon on Uniform
 Confession (1937) - Xenia
 Varsity Show (1937) - Passerby (uncredited)
 It's Love I'm After (1937) - Elsie
 Alcatraz Island (1937) - The Red Head
 Submarine D-1 (1937) - Dolly
 Missing Witnesses (1937) - Miss Friday (uncredited)
 She Loved a Fireman (1937) - Betty Williams
 Over the Wall (1938) - Maxine
 The Law Comes to Texas (1939) - Dora Lewis
 Miracle on Main Street (1939) - Flo
 The Shadow (1940, Serial) - Margot Lane
 Cafe Hostess (1940) - Cafe Hostess (uncredited)
 I Take This Oath (1940) - Flo
 Dr. Christian Meets the Women (1940) - Carol Compton
 Laughing at Danger (1940) - Celeste
 Glamour for Sale (1940) - Lucille
 Hit Parade of 1941 (1940) - (uncredited)
 Bitter Sweet (1940) - Manon
 Melody Ranch (1940) - Receptionist (uncredited)
 Behind the News (1940) - Bessie
 Arkansas Judge (1941) - Hettie Huston
 The Penalty (1941) - Julie
 I'll Wait for You (1941) - Manicurist (uncredited)
 The Get-Away (1941) - Black's Blonde Dance Hall Pickup (uncredited)
 The Pittsburgh Kid (1941) - Barbara Ellison
 Down in San Diego (1941) - Cashier (uncredited)
 Honky Tonk (1941) - Pearl
 The Corsican Brothers (1941) - Maria
 Duke of the Navy (1942) - Maureen
 Two Yanks in Trinidad (1942) - Bubbles
 She's in the Army (1942) - Diane Jordan
 I Married an Angel (1942) - Ilona Prohaska (uncredited)
 Sherlock Holmes and the Secret Weapon (1942) - Bar Singer (voice, uncredited)
 Something to Shout About (1943) - Flo Bentley
 Murder in Times Square (1943) - Fiona Maclair
 False Faces (1943) - Joyce Ford
 Isle of Forgotten Sins (1943) - Luana
 Revenge of the Zombies (1943) - Lila Von Altermann
 The Girl from Monterrey (1943) - Flossie Rankin
 The Unknown Guest (1943) - Helen Walker
 Smart Guy (1943) - Lee
 Standing Room Only (1944) - Peggy Fuller
 Detective Kitty O'Day (1944) - Mrs. Wentworth
 Marked Trails (1944) - Blanche - aka Mary Conway, aka Susanna
 The Girl Who Dared (1944) - Cynthia Harrison / Sylvia Scott
 The Big Noise (1944) - Mayme Charlton
 Irish Eyes Are Smiling (1944) - Belle La Tour
 The Falcon in Hollywood (1944) - Billie Atkins
 What a Blonde (1945) - Pat Campbell
 Fog Island (1945) - Sylvia
 Bring On the Girls (1945) - Girl at Bar with Phil (uncredited)
 Rough, Tough and Ready (1945) - Lorine Gray
 Don Juan Quilligan (1945) - Beattle LaRue
 Scared Stiff (1945) - Flo Rosson
 Dangerous Intruder (1945) - Jenny
 Jungle Raiders (1945, Serial) - Cora Bell
 Love, Honor and Goodbye (1945) - Marge
 Mildred Pierce (1945) - Miriam Ellis
 Life with Blondie (1945) - Hazel
 Avalanche (1946) - Claire Jeremy
 Big Town (1946) - Vivian LeRoy
 Accomplice (1946) - Joyce Kimball Bonniwell
 Wife Wanted (1946) - Nola Reed
 The Fabulous Suzanne (1946) - Mary
 The Pilgrim Lady (1947) - Eve Standish
 The Bachelor and the Bobby-Soxer (1947) - Agnes Prescott
 Mother Wore Tights (1947) - Rosemary Olcott
 Blonde Savage (1947) - Connie Harper
 Julia Misbehaves (1948) - Louise
 Chicken Every Sunday (1949) - Rita Kirby
 Mississippi Rhythm (1949) - Jeanette
 One Last Fling (1949) - Gaye Winston Lardner
 Forgotten Women (1949) - Clair Dunning
 Rider from Tucson (1950) - Gypsy Avery
 The Kangaroo Kid (1950) - Stella Grey
 Hold That Line (1952) - Candy Calin
 Aaron Slick from Punkin Crick (1952) - Girl in Red
 Big Jim McLain (1952) - Madge
 A Perilous Journey (1953) - Sadie
 Mister Scoutmaster (1953) - Blonde
 Hot News (1953) - Doris Burton
 Three Sailors and a Girl (1953) - Faye Foss
 Bitter Creek (1954) - Whitey
 Love Me or Leave Me (1955) - Dance Hall Hostess (uncredited)
 You're Never Too Young (1955) - Mrs. Noonan
 Guys and Dolls (1955) - Laverne
 I'll Cry Tomorrow (1955) - Waitress (uncredited)
 Frontier Gambler (1956) - Francie Merritt
 Naked Gun (1956) - Susan Stark
 The Wings of Eagles (1957) - (uncredited)
 The Restless Gun (1958) - Episode "Mercyday"
 The Fearmakers (1958) - Vivian Loder
 Thunder in the Sun (1959) - Marie (uncredited)
 The Alamo (1960) - Blind Nell Robertson

References

External links

Veda Ann Borg

Deaths from cancer in California
Actresses from Boston
American film actresses
1915 births
1973 deaths
American people of Swedish descent
20th-century American actresses
American television actresses
California Democrats
Massachusetts Democrats